Dominik Walter Roland Klein (born 16 December 1983) is a former German handball player who last played for HBC Nantes.

He is World champion from 2007 with the German national team. He participated on the German team that finished 4th at the 2008 European Men's Handball Championship.

Club player
Klein played for the German club THW Kiel which won both the EHF Champions League and the EHF Men's Champions Trophy in 2007, in addition to winning German championships.

On 22 March 2018, he announced his retirement for the end of the 2017–18 season.

Personalities
In 2009 he married his girlfriend Isabell, who is a handball player (Buxdehuder SV), too. They are the only family in Germany who has a handball player in both the men and the women national team.

References

External links

1983 births
Living people
People from Miltenberg
Sportspeople from Lower Franconia
German male handball players
Handball players at the 2008 Summer Olympics
Olympic handball players of Germany
German expatriate sportspeople in France
Expatriate handball players
Handball-Bundesliga players
THW Kiel players